Jaghatu may refer to:

 Jaghatū District, a district in Ghazni Province, Afghanistan
 Jaghatu District (Wardak), a district in Maidan Wardak Province, Afghanistan

Disambig-Class Afghanistan articles